Lutcher can refer to:

People
 Henry J. Lutcher, a sawmiller and business partner of the Lutcher and Moore Lumber Company
 Nellie Lutcher, an African-American jazz singer and pianist

Places
 Lutcher, Louisiana, United States